The Town of Montezuma is a statutory town located in eastern Summit County, Colorado, United States. The town population was 65 at 2010 United States Census. It is situated in the upper valley of the Snake River above the ski resort of Keystone in the Rocky Mountains.

Description
The town, which is named for Montezuma, the Emperor of the Aztecs, consists largely of historical buildings and houses lining unpaved streets at the end of the paved county road that ascends the Snake River from Keystone near the west side of Loveland Pass. The town sits in a high steep valley surrounded by forested peaks offering good access to higher national forest land destinations. The paved road up from Keystone leads mainly through national forest right up to the entrance of town, which is marked by a sign over the county road.

The town retains many older structures, some of them dating from the late 19th century, such as the picturesque school house dating from the 1880s, now a State of Colorado Historical Site. The town is often included in lists of ghost towns in the Colorado Rockies, but it nevertheless retains a small population of full-time residents, as well as many absentee homeowners.

From 2004 until 2009, a small low-powered FM station (KMZM 96.5 then 96.7), which was receivable only near and in the town, operated from one of the houses.

Montezuma has some of the most popular backcountry skiing, biking, snowmobiling, snowshoeing and hiking trails in Summit County. Montezuma is listed as one of Colorado's top scenic places in John Fielder's Best of Colorado.

History

The town founded in 1865 following the discovery of silver in the vicinity of nearby Argentine Pass. It was populated by prospectors coming over the passes from nearby Georgetown. The town was incorporated in 1881. A local newspaper, the Montezuma Mill Run, began publishing in 1882. In its inaugural issue, the Mill Run described the town as having two hotels, three stores, three saloons, two blacksmiths, one shoemaker, and a number of restaurants and boarding houses.

In 1890, at the height of the Colorado Silver Boom, the population reached nearly 10,000. At the time, the town had two stores, a post office, two hotels (the Summit House and the Rocky Mountain House), and a sawmill. It eventually had a smelter, as well, which allowed local separation of the silver and lead ores, which are typically found together in the region. At the town's peak, the mountainside around the town was location of numerous mines on the Belle and Blance lodes, operated by the Sts. John Mining Company, after which the nearby ghost town of Saints John is named. Saints John now consists of three cabins near timberline, at 10,764 feet.

The town experienced a steep decline after the Silver Bust in 1893. It experienced a slight revival in mining interest in 1940, but has remained fairly quiet since World War II. The town has experienced five major fires throughout its history, including ones in 1949 and 1958 which destroyed many of the historic structures, including the Summit House, which burned in the fire of Christmas 1958. Other fires in the 1970s and 1980s destroyed additional historic buildings and businesses, leaving the town with little current economic base. Presently, the town is experiencing a high surge of interest as the value of real estate in proximity to ski areas and with access to wilderness increases substantially.

In 2008, the Town Board of Montezuma and the Summit County Sheriff's Office began vigorously enforcing the county's prohibition of parking on county roads and private property within the town by ticketing and towing illegally parked vehicles. The increased use of the nearby trails by recreational users had created a huge parking problem within the town, causing both safety and quality of life issues for the town residents. It was not uncommon for Montezuma Road to be literally a one-lane road, impeding any emergency vehicles that needed to get through Montezuma. In addition, the Sheriff's Department has begun to crack down on speeders who do not obey the 10 mph speed limit.

In 2014, after a controversial election, the town sued all registered voters to force them to appear in court.

Geography

Montezuma is located at  (39.581389, -105.867778).

Climate
Montezuma has a subarctic climate (Dfc) with short, mild summers and long, cold winters.

Demographics

As of the census of 2000, there were 42 people, 20 households, and 6 families residing in the town. The racial make up of the city was 100% White. 2.4% of the population were Hispanic or Latino of any race.

There were 20 households, out of which 25.0% had children under the age of 18 living with them, 25.0% were married couples living together, and 70.0% were non-families. 35.0% of all households were made up of individuals, and none had someone living alone who was 65 years of age or older. The average household size was 2.10 and the average family size was 3.33.

In the town, the population was spread out, with 19.0% under the age of 18, 11.9% from 18 to 24, 50.0% from 25 to 44, 19.0% from 45 to 64. The median age was 36 years.

The median income for a household in the town was $38,750, and the median income for a family was $53,750. Males had a median income of $36,250 versus $16,250 for females. The per capita income for the town was $31,924.

See also

Outline of Colorado
Index of Colorado-related articles
State of Colorado
Colorado cities and towns
Colorado municipalities
Colorado counties
Summit County, Colorado
Colorado metropolitan areas
Silverthorne, CO Micropolitan Statistical Area
Front Range
Keystone Resort
White River National Forest

References

Further reading
Jeep Trails to Colorado Ghost Towns, Robert L. Brown

External links

CDOT map of the Town of Montezuma

Towns in Summit County, Colorado
Towns in Colorado
Colorado placenames of Native American origin